Michael Kantor (born August 7, 1939) is an American attorney who served as the United States Trade Representative from 1993 to 1996 and United States Secretary of Commerce in 1996 and 1997.

Early life and education
Born and raised in Nashville, Tennessee, Kantor earned a Bachelor of Arts degree in business and economics from Vanderbilt University in 1961. He then served four years as a supply officer in the United States Navy and subsequently earned a Juris Doctor from Georgetown University in 1968.

Career 
Initially, Kantor worked for the Legal Services Corporation, providing legal assistance to migrant farm workers. From 1976 to 1993, he practiced law with the Los Angeles law firm of Manatt, Phelps, Phillips & Kantor (now Manatt, Phelps & Phillips LLP), and was active in Democratic politics and fundraising. He formerly served and is founder of the LA Conservation Corps.

An advocate of free trade, Kantor, as Trade Representative, led U.S. negotiations that created the World Trade Organization (WTO), such as the Uruguay Round, and North American Free Trade Agreement (NAFTA). Kantor also engaged in organizing the Miami Summit of the Americas and three meetings of the Asia-Pacific Economic Cooperation, including the U.S.-hosted First Leaders' Meeting. With the European Commission of the newly formed European Union, he expanded the trans-Atlantic market.

Kantor became United States Secretary of Commerce on April 12, 1996, succeeding Ron Brown, who had been killed in the 1996 Croatia USAF CT-43 crash.

Kantor practices law in the Los Angeles office of Mayer Brown, an international law firm based in Chicago. He is the board of directors co-chair of Vision to Learn and the University of Southern California Annenberg Center on Communication Leadership & Policy; a board officer of Drug Strategies; a leadership council member of the Sargent Shriver Center on Poverty Law; a steering committee member of Japan House; and a board member of Lexmark International, Inc. and the Pacific Council on International Policy.

Personal life and honors 
Kantor has been married to broadcast journalist Heidi Schulman since 1982, following the death of his first wife, Valerie Woods Kantor in a 1978 plane crash in San Diego. He has three children. Another son, Russell, died in a single-car crash in October, 1988, while a senior in high school.

He formerly served on the board of directors of CBRE, board of visitors for Georgetown Law, and international advisory board for FleishmanHillard. Kantor was awarded the Order of the Southern Cross by the government of Brazil in 2001.

References

External links

|-

|-

1939 births
Clinton administration cabinet members
20th-century American politicians
American corporate directors
Georgetown University Law Center alumni
Jewish American members of the Cabinet of the United States
Living people
Politicians from Nashville, Tennessee
Tennessee Democrats
United States Navy officers
United States Secretaries of Commerce
United States Trade Representatives
Vanderbilt University alumni
People associated with Mayer Brown